Nassima Saifi (born 29 October 1988) is a Paralympian athlete from Algeria competing mainly in category F58 throwing events. Specialising in both the discus throw and shot put, Saifi is a double Paralympic gold medal winner and three time World Champion.

Personal history
Saifi was born in Mila, Algeria in 1988. Born able-bodied, she had her left leg amputated following after being hit by a car in 1998. Her father, realizing she needed something to work on in her spare time, encouraged her to take up an athletics career. She joined the Mila handisport club where she was able to train.

Athletic career
Thanks to her father's assistance and encouragement, Saifi made her international debut for Algeria at the 2006 IPC Athletics World Championships in Assen. She entered both the shot put and discus throw, finishing fifth in both. Saifi made her first appearance at a Summer Paralympics in the 2008 Games in Beijing. She entered both the shot put and discus throw, finishing tenth and fourth respectively.

Saifi's first major international success came at the 2011 IPC Athletics World Championships in Christchurch, where she entered both the discus throw and the shot put. Although finishing ninth in the shot, she threw a distance of 40.99 metres to win the gold medal, an  improvement of over six metres on her Beijing best. The following year she appeared at the 2012 Paralympics in London, winning gold in the discus and making her the joint World and Paralympic champion.

At the 2013 IPC World Championships in Lyon Saifi not only retained her discus title, but also won a bronze in the shot put, her first medal in the event at world level. The discus event was a close affair with Saifi requiring a world record throw of 42.05 metres to record a higher points tally over Ireland's Orla Barry. Two years later in Doha, Saifi claimed her third consecutive World discus title in her class.

In preparation for the Paralympics, she was trained by Hocine Saadoun for three hours a day, every day, except for weekends.
Saifi cemented her position as one of the greatest Paralympic competitors at the 2016 Summer Paralympics in Rio. Despite throwing well below her best (her winning throw being 33.33 metres) she was still able to take the gold medal, making her unbeaten at world and Paralympic level since 2011. She also took silver in her less favoured shot put, her first at a Paralympics.

References

External links 
 

1988 births
Paralympic athletes of Algeria
Athletes (track and field) at the 2008 Summer Paralympics
Athletes (track and field) at the 2012 Summer Paralympics
Athletes (track and field) at the 2016 Summer Paralympics
Athletes (track and field) at the 2020 Summer Paralympics
Paralympic gold medalists for Algeria
Paralympic silver medalists for Algeria
Algerian female discus throwers
Algerian female shot putters
Living people
Medalists at the 2012 Summer Paralympics
Medalists at the 2016 Summer Paralympics
People from Mila Province
African Games gold medalists for Algeria
African Games medalists in athletics (track and field)
African Games silver medalists for Algeria
Athletes (track and field) at the 2015 African Games
World Para Athletics Championships winners
Paralympic medalists in athletics (track and field)
21st-century Algerian women
Wheelchair discus throwers
Wheelchair shot putters
Paralympic discus throwers
Paralympic shot putters